Dolce Vita String Quartet was formed in 2004, performing throughout Europe and in 2007 & 2008 on luxury cruise ships. All are classically trained musicians at the famous National Music Academy of Ukraine by P.I. Tchaikovsky in Kyiv. Dolce Vita String Quartet have released 2 albums as digital releases on iTunes & eMusic

Members of Dolce Vita String Quartet 
 Nadiia Khodakovska (First Violinist)
 Iryna Olshanska (Second Violinist)
 Nataliia Lozova (Violist)
 Olena Moshynska (Cellist 2004-2008)
 Svitlana Nesterova (Cellist 2008–present)

Discography
 Dolce Vita String Quartet
 Eternal Classic

External links
 
 MySpace presence
 eMusic link

String quartets